Fragment (Random House, 2009) is a science-based thriller by best-selling author and screenwriter Warren Fahy. The novel focuses on a crew of young scientists from a reality TV show who must try to survive when their research vessel, the Trident, lands on Henders Island, where predatory creatures have been living and evolving for over half a billion years. Producer Lloyd Levin optioned Fahy's screenplay adaptation of Fragment for a major motion picture. Pandemonium, Fahy's sequel to Fragment, was published in March 2013.

Plot summary
In 1791, Captain Ambrose Henders and his crew stop at a tiny island in search of fresh water in the South Pacific. After one man, Henry Frears, is sent to obtain water, Captain Henders is forced to retreat to prevent more loss of life when Frears is eaten by unknown creatures. He writes of the account in his journal.

In the present day, an exploratory research vessel "The Trident" sails across the same stretch of the Pacific filming for a documentary series called "Sea life".  When Captain Sol picks up an EPIRB distress beacon, The crew decides to investigate. They set ashore to scope out the shipwrecked "Balboa Bilbo", from which the distress beacon emanated. After arriving at the wreck, the crew are attacked by monstrous creatures. In the ensuing chaos, a camera captures the deaths of nearly all the crew as the rest of the world watches on a live feed. Researcher Nell and cameraman Zero barely manage to escape with their lives.

Eight days after the "Sea Life" incident, Nell has been called back to Hender's Island, after the live feed caused panic and forced the U.S. military to quarantine the island for study.  After several attempts, a few live specimens are captured. During examination, they turn out to be highly specialized arthropods new to science. A mongoose is released into the jungle wearing a "critter cam" in an attempt to compare the Hender's Island fauna to invasive fauna from different areas of the world. The mongoose does not survive for more than a few minutes.

It appears the animals of Henders Island are able to reproduce continuously, and are stronger and faster than any other creatures on earth due to their copper-based blood, two brains and their super adaptability, as demonstrated during the tests involving rival species that have been imported.  Nell and Dr. Livingstone present their report on the Island's formation and evolution to the military and the President of the United States, and reveal a horrifying truth; Henders Island's flora and fauna are so well adapted that if they were to escape, they would cause global collapse.

The destruction of the island is approved, but before it can occur, Nell and the others must deal with the mysterious entities that have been observing them.

References

2009 American novels
American thriller novels